This is a list of amphibians and reptiles found on the islands of Saint Kitts and Nevis, a two-island nation in the Caribbean Lesser Antilles.  The islands are separated by a narrow strait that is only 3.2 km wide and 15 m deep, and thus the two islands have very similar faunas.

Amphibians
There are two species of amphibian recorded on Saint Kitts and Nevis.

Frogs (Anura)

Reptiles
Including marine turtles and introduced species, there are 14 reptile species reported on Saint Kitts and 12 species on Nevis.

Turtles (Testudines)

Lizards and snakes (Squamata)

Notes

References
Note: All records of species that listed above are supported by Malhotra & Thorpe 1999, unless otherwise cited.

.

Saint Kitts and Nevis
Saint Kitts and Nevis
 Saint Kitts and Nevis
 Saint Kitts and Nevis
 Amphibians
Saint Kitts and Nevis
amphibians and reptiles
Saint Kitts and Nevis